The grey-headed swamphen (Porphyrio poliocephalus) is a species of swamphen occurring from the Middle East and the Indian subcontinent to southern China and northern Thailand. It used to be considered a subspecies of the purple swamphen, but was elevated to full species status in 2015; today the purple swamphen is considered a superspecies and each of its six subspecies groups are designated full species.

The male has an elaborate courtship display, holding water weeds in his bill and bowing to the female with loud chuckles.

The grey-headed swamphen was introduced to North America in the late 1990s due to avicultural escapes in the Pembroke Pines, Florida area. State wildlife biologists attempted to eradicate the birds, but they have multiplied and can now be found in many areas of southern Florida. Ornithological authorities consider it likely that the swamphen will become an established part of Florida's avifauna. It was added to the American Birding Association checklist in February 2013.

Taxonomy and systematics 
The grey-headed swamphen is one of 15 species in the genus Porphyrio. It was classified as a subspecies of P. porphyrio until 2015, when the purple swamphen species complex was split into 6 species.

Subspecies 

 P. p. poliocephalus- Latham, 1801: The nominate subspecies. Found from India (including the Andaman and Nicobar Islands) and Sri Lanka to southern China and northern Thailand.
 P. p. seistanicus- Zarudny and Härms, 1911: Found from Iraq and southern Iran to Pakistan, Afghanistan, and northwestern India. There is also an introduced population in Florida.
 P. p. caspius- Hartert, 1917 : Found near the Caspian Sea, northwestern Iran, and Turkey.

References

External links

grey-headed swamphen
Birds of Western Asia
Birds of South Asia
grey-headed swamphen
grey-headed swamphen